Jalponga River is a river in La Paz Department, El Salvador.

References

Rivers of El Salvador